The eighth season of the talent show The Voice of Germany premiered on October 18, 2018 on ProSieben and on October 21, 2018 on Sat.1. Michi & Smudo, Yvonne Catterfeld and Mark Forster returned for their fifth, third and second seasons respectively. Michael Patrick Kelly was declared as the new coach, joining the show for the first time, replacing Samu Haber. Both hosts returned Thore Schölermann returning for his seventh season and Lena Gercke returning for her fourth season.

On December 16, 2018, Samuel Rösch was crowned the winner of The Voice of Germany 2018, marking Michael Patrick Kelly's first and only win as a coach.

Coaches and hosts 

On May 19, 2018, it was announced that after 2 years Samu Haber would not be returning to the show. On June 20, 2018, it was announced that Haber was replaced by new coach Michael Patrick Kelly and returning coaches Michi & Smudo, Yvonne Catterfeld and Mark Forster.

Thore Schölermann and Lena Gercke both returned as hosts.

Teams
Colour key:

Blind Auditions

Episode 5 (November 1)

Sing Off
The Sing Off determines which three artists from each team will advance to the final round of competition, the Semi Final. In this round, after an artist performs, he or she will sit in one of three seats above the stage. The first three artists performing from each team will sit down, but once the fourth artist performs, a coach has the choice of replacing the fourth artist with any artist sitting down or eliminating them immediately. Once all artists have performed, those who remain seated will advance to the Semi Final. The two Sing Off episodes was broadcast on 2 and 6 December.

Color key
 – Contestant was eliminated, either immediately or switched with another contestant
 – Contestant was not switched out and advanced to the Semi-final

Live Shows

Week 1: Semifinals (December 9)
The semi final aired on December 9, 2018 – with three acts from each team performing. The public chose one artist from each team to advance to the final. 
 Group performance: Rita Ora and Top 12 - "Let You Love Me"

Week 2: Finale (December 16)
The final aired on December 16, 2018 – with one artist from each team performing.

Elimination Chart

Overall
Color key
Artist's info

Result details

Team
Color key
Artist's info

Result details

References

External links
 Official website on ProSieben.de
 The Voice of Germany on fernsehserien.de

2018 German television seasons
8